The Curse is a 1988 short story by Andre Dubus. It is realistic fiction and deals with the problem of standing by or helping out when chaos occurs.

Plot
Mitchell, a man who is clearly an Average Joe, he married a divorced women and adopted her two teenagers, they are normal.  He is perfectly happy with life,  but one day five stoned bikers enter his bar, and rape a young women who has entered too. He feels as though he should fight back against them, but instead does nothing except for calling the police. She is sent to the hospital. When he returns to work, the curse takes full effect, he sees everyone differently, and is greatly saddened by the events that have traumatized him.and Mitchell loses his joy in life, the "curse" in the title.

Analysis 
The point of view is third person limited objective: Dubus tells everything from a neutral point of view, he talks about what happens to Mitchell with no interjections. He intentionally withholds information for a dramatic effect. Since this type of narration is the most common, it fits in with the type of story, and the fact that it could happen to anyone.

At the very beginning of the story, the reader is treated with details about Mitchell, mostly physical. One is imbibed with the fact Mitchell is pretty darn normal: he is 49, he is fit and a normal height. He remains this way throughout the book, but Dubus says in the onset that he feels like an elderly, with an "exhaustion that could not be overcome with sleep and rest". He seems to be a kind man, he loves his wife and "children", he clearly cared about the victim in his bar. Dubus used both exposition and indirect characterization to create a likable and realistic character for The Curse.

The setting in The Curse is pretty mundane: the first location is some bar near the boardwalk of a beach.

Andre Dubus' writing style is actually very similar to Ernest Hemingway's style. He states facts, which in some ways break the classic rule of "show, don't tell". He lists all the facts about a location, yet he still uses his words to imply details about places or people. "Mitchell looked away, at the front door. He had put the chairs upside down on the table."-Paragraph 2. Here, Dubus tells the reader what is going on, without obfuscating the meaning with needless adjectives or purple prose. This creates an easy read, one that is fit for a short story and will not confuse a reader.

The tone is grim. It is marred by gloom and sadness. Dubus, of course, needed to let the reader know the mental anguish Mitchell feels. To do this, he reiterates the fact that Mitchell feels older and the details of the rape that he witnessed. The tone is absolutely perfect for the story, as it is a gloomy, regretful reflection of past events. Is would not have worked if Dubus described everything in a cheerful manner or with joy in his prose, it has to be grim. This helps play a role into the theme of guilt.

The overarching theme of the story is simply guilt. Mitchell feels guilty because he did not assist the girl until after she had been raped mercilessly. As a result, he can not view anything in the same light anymore, he sees everyone in his bar differently, and he gets the inkling that they do the same unto him. He still has flashbacks to that night weeks after the event, hallucinating that she and the bikers are still in his  bar, remembering every puny detail.

Although it may not be obvious at first, the symbol in The Curse is actually the bar in which Mitchell works. It is a location where innocence comes to die. People come into the bar, xertzing their meals and getting into fights. The victim of the story is a young girl who walked in, not looking for trouble, and was fairly well off. Although she had purish intentions, she ended up getting raped by men who possess no respect for women.

Andre Dubus crafted a clever tone where he shows an "average Joe" struggling with guilt after a woman is raped right in front of him. Although he penned this story almost 30 years ago, it is hardly less poignant to this day.

Reception
The online site Questia reviewed this work and called it a tale dealing with "guilt, inaction, and manhood", greatly praising the work and the effort put into it.

References

External links
 -A detailed analysis on eNotes.

1988 short stories
Rape in fiction